Canthigaster criobe, known as the striped toby, is a species of pufferfish in the family Tetraodontidae. It is known only from French Polynesia, where it occurs at a depth range of 15 to 20 m (49 to 66 ft). The species is currently known to reach up to 3.9 cm (1.5 inches) SL, though it is possible that larger specimens exist that have not yet been reported or collected as typical members of Canthigaster are notably larger. It has multiple thin brown stripes along its body, a feature which sets it apart from its congeners. It was described in 2012 and named for the Centre de Recherche Insulaire et Observatoire de l'Environnement (CRIOBE), Moorea, French Polynesia, in recognition of the laboratory's continued support of marine research in the area.

References 

criobe
Fish described in 2012
Fish of the Pacific Ocean